Josef Diefenthal (5 October 1915 – 13 April 2001) was a mid-ranking commander in the Waffen-SS of Nazi Germany and a war criminal during World War II. He was a recipient of the Knight's Cross of the Iron Cross on 5 February 1945 for his actions during the Ardennes Offensive, while in command of the 3rd Battalion, 2nd SS Panzer Grenadier Regiment, SS Division Leibstandarte.

Diefenthal was found guilty of war crimes at the Malmedy massacre trial committed during the Battle of the Bulge, and sentenced to death, which was later changed to life imprisonment. He was released in 1956.

References

Citations

Bibliography

 

1915 births
2001 deaths
SS-Sturmbannführer
Recipients of the Gold German Cross
Recipients of the Knight's Cross of the Iron Cross
Waffen-SS personnel
German prisoners sentenced to death
People from Euskirchen
Military personnel from North Rhine-Westphalia
People convicted in the Malmedy massacre trial
Prisoners sentenced to death by the United States military